Centule IV Gaston (died 1058), called the Old, was the seventh Viscount of Béarn from 1012 to his death.

He succeeded his father Gaston II while yet a minor, under a regency until 1022. His mother was his father's wife of an unknown name.

Reign 
Centule placed great importance on maintaining good relations with the Catholic Church. In the year in which he assumed the powers of government, he founded the  near the border with Bigorre. He was subsequently installed as the defensor of that monastery and of the lands of Saint Peter in Gascony and Béarn by his suzerain Sancho VI William of Gascony. In 1033, Centule confirmed the possession of the county of Bordeaux by Duke Odo.

He strove to expand his power into neighboring territories and married Angela, daughter and heiress of the neighboring Viscount Aner II Lupo of Oloron, thus uniting those two entities. He gained the valleys of Aspe, Ossau, and  all the way from the river Oloron to Navarrenx. His eldest son Gaston III was associated with the vicecomital throne, but died in or before 1045. He warred against the viscounts of Dax and Soule, killing the viscount Arnold II of Dax in 1050. He himself died in a Souletin ambush eight years later. His grandson Centule V succeeded him.

Children 
Aside from Gaston, he had six children:
Raymond Centule
Igon
Baudreix
Boeil
Auga

Sources 

1058 deaths
Viscounts of Béarn
Military personnel killed in action
Year of birth unknown